C/2019 Y1 (ATLAS) is a comet with a near-parabolic orbit discovered by the ATLAS survey on 16 December 2019. It passed perihelion on March 15, 2020 at 0.84 AU from the sun. Its orbit is very similar to C/1988 A1 (Liller), C/1996 Q1 (Tabur), and C/2015 F3 (SWAN), suggesting they may be fragments of a larger ancient comet.

Observations 
The comet passed close to Earth in early May 2020. It was visible in the northern hemisphere sky in the spring of 2020.

References

External links
 TheSkyLive  Comet C/2019 Y1 (ATLAS)
 astro.vanbuitenen.nl 2019Y1
 Universe Today March 25, 2020 by David Dickinson

C2019Y4
Discoveries by ATLAS
20191216
Comets in 2020